The United States Air Force's 5th Air Support Operations Squadron is a combat support squadron located at Fort Lewis, Washington. The unit provides tactical command and control of airpower assets to the Joint Forces Air Component Commander and Joint Forces Land Component Commander for combat operations.

History

World War II
The squadron was first activated in May 1942 as the 5th Communications Squadron.  After training in the United States, it moved to Australia in May 1943, where it became an element of Fifth Air Force as the 5th Air Support Communication Squadron.  It participated in combat, earning arrowhead devices for participation in amphibious landings in New Guinea, the Bismark Archipelago, and Leyte.  Its air support parties served with United States Marines and United States and Australian Army forces, directing air support missions for the forces they served.  After V-J Day, the squadron was inactivated in the Philippines in November 1945.

Reactivation
The squadron was reactivated at Fort Lewis, Washington in July 1994 as the 5th Air Support Operations Squadron.  It has supported combat operations during the Global War on Terror since 2001.   The unit's Joint Terminal Attack Controllers are traditionally aligned with I Corps and the Joint Base Lewis-McChord based Stryker Brigades, but due to manning shortages and theater requirements, the unit's airmen have deployed with many different units during the past decade.

Lineage
 Constituted as the 5th Communications Squadron, Air Support on 15 May 1942
 Activated on 22 May 1942
 Redesignated 5th Air Support Communication Squadron on 11 January 1943
 Redesignated 5th Air Support Control Squadron on 20 August 1943
 Redesignated 5th Tactical Air Communications Squadron on 1 April 1944
 Inactivated on 28 November 1945
 Disbanded on 8 October 1948
 Reconstituted and redesignated 5th Air Support Operations Squadron on 24 June 1994
  Activated on 1 July 1994

Assignments
 I Ground Air Support Command (later I Air Support Command), 15 May 1942
 Fifth Air Force, June 1943
 308th Bombardment Wing, 25 July 1945
 XIII Bomber Command, 20 October–28 November 1945
 1st Air Support Operations Group, 1 July 1994 – present

Stations
 Mitchel Field, New York, 22 May 1942
 Lebanon, Tennessee, 9 September 1942
 Morris Field, North Carolina, c. 21 October 1942 – 8 May 1943
 Brisbane, New South Wales, Australia, 13 June 1943
 Cairns, Queensland, Australia, 26 July 1943
 Port Moresby, New Guinea, 11 September 1943
 Finschhafen, New Guinea, 29 February 1944
 Hollandia, New Guinea, Netherlands East Indies, 30 August 1944
 Morotai, Netherlands East Indies, 1 October 1944
 Clark Field, Luzon, Philippines, 14 May–28 November 1945
 Fort Lewis (later Joint Base Lewis-McChord), Washington, 1 July 1994 – present

References

Notes

Bibliography

Air support operations squadrons of the United States Air Force